Narrow World of Sports (previously titled The Professor's Second Year Syndrome, The Professor's Farewell Tour and The Professor's Late Hit) is an Australian sports television show broadcast on Fox League on Friday nights at the conclusion of the nights NRL fixture. The show is co-hosted by James "The Professor" Rochford and Andrew "Barney" Barnett, who are joined each week by the former rugby league footballer; Nathan Hindmarsh, along with 10 News First journalist Emma Lawrence. The show takes a satirical look at controversies and issues in rugby league.

In December 2018, James Rochford (brother of the well-liked, and more successful Andrew Rochford) and co-host Andrew Barnett started presenting a spin-off show titled The Night Watchmen that aired on Fox Cricket during the 2018-19 cricket season.

Production of the show was ceased after one episode in 2020 as COVID-19 restrictions prevented studio audiences from attending the recordings.

Presenters
 James "The Professor" Rochford (main host and forever living in the shadow of his brother Dr Andrew Rochford, 2017–present)
 Andrew "Barney" Barnett (The NRL Store infomercials 2018, co-host 2019–present)
 Nathan Hindmarsh (regular appearances 2017, co-host 2018–present)
 Emma Lawrence (news reporter, 2018–present)

Regular appearances

Current
 Bryan Fletcher
 Emma Freedman
 Sam Taunton

Past
 Brett Finch (co-host, 2017-2018)
 Chris "Pagey" Page (co-host and barman, 2017-2018)
 Herman Mose (security guard)
 Tommy Tuxedo
 Matthew Johns (as himself and as character Mighty Mick Matherson)
 John Hopoate
 Steven Menzies

History
The show was announced as part of the 2017 Fox League line-up of programming at the official launch of the channel at Birchgrove Oval, Balmain on 15 February 2017. The show premiered on Friday 3 March 2017 at approximately 10pm following the South Sydney Rabbitohs vs West Tigers NRL fixture.

Rochford was a regular on Monday Night with Matty Johns in the years prior to the shows premiere, presenting the weekly Not The NRL News segment - a satirical look at the week in NRL. The show is described as being "Not The NRL News on steroids".

The first season of the program, broadcast in 2017, was titled The Professor's Second Year Syndrome. However, the show changed its title to The Professor's Farewell Tour for its second season in 2018. The premise and content of the program however have remained much the same as the previous year.

In 2017, The Professor's Second Year Syndrome was broadcast live to air. However, in 2018 the show is pre-recorded with any swearing censored.

For the 2019 season, the title of the show was changed to The Professor's Late Hit, and adopted a similar format to their cricket-related show The Night Watchmen, whereby each episode featured a special guest, whose career was reflected upon.

For the 2020 season, the show was renamed to Narrow World of Sports, a play on words with Nine's Wide World of Sports.

Series overview

Episodes

Season 1 (2017) - The Professor's Second Year Syndrome

Note: All episodes feature James Rochford, Brett Finch and Chris Page, unless otherwise noted.

Season 2 (2018) - The Professor's Farewell Tour

Note: All episodes feature James Rochford, Brett Finch, Chris Page, Nathan Hindmarsh and Emma Lawrence, unless otherwise noted.

Season 3 (2019) - The Professor's Late Hit

Note: All episodes feature James Rochford, Andrew Barnett, Nathan Hindmarsh and Emma Lawrence, unless otherwise noted.

Season 4 (2020) - Narrow World of Sports

Note: Production of the show was ceased after one episode as COVID-19 restrictions prevented studio audiences from attending the recordings.

See also

 List of Australian television series

References

External links
 
 
 

2010s Australian television series
English-language television shows
Australian sports television series
Fox Sports (Australian TV network) original programming
Rugby league television shows